Joaquim Manuel Rodrigues Silva Marques (born 22 August 1948 in Lisbon), known as Nelinho, is a retired Portuguese footballer who played as a right winger.

External links
 
 
 

1948 births
Living people
Footballers from Lisbon
Portuguese footballers
Association football wingers
Primeira Liga players
S.C. Beira-Mar players
S.L. Benfica footballers
S.C. Braga players
C.S. Marítimo players
Portugal international footballers